Evelyn Zangger (born 6 December 1980) is a Swiss singer-songwriter from Zurich.

References

1980 births
Living people
Swiss house musicians
Swiss singer-songwriters
21st-century Swiss women
People from Zürich